Bezgovica is a small settlement in the Municipality of Šmarje pri Jelšah in eastern Slovenia. The municipality is included in the Savinja Statistical Region. The area is part of the traditional region of Styria.

References

External links
Bezgovica at Geopedia

Populated places in the Municipality of Šmarje pri Jelšah